Billy Curran is a New Zealand rugby league player who represented New Zealand.

Playing career
Curran was playing rugby union in Auckland before switching codes and joining the Newton Rangers. He played one match for Newton on June 8 against Manukau and was then selected for representative matches. He debuted for Auckland and played 6 matches for them in the same season. He was selected to tour Australia in 1912 for New Zealand.

In December 1912 he left for England, after being signed by Wigan on the recommendation of George A. Gillett. He played three seasons for Wigan, being part of Lancashire League winning sides each year.

References

Living people
New Zealand rugby league players
New Zealand national rugby league team players
Auckland rugby league team players
Newton Rangers players
Rugby league wingers
Rugby league centres
Wigan Warriors players
Year of birth missing (living people)